Awaous grammepomus, the Scribbled goby, is a species of goby native to freshwater streams and rivers and brackish estuaries from Sri Lanka to New Guinea with a report of it occurring in Palau.  This species can reach a length of  SL.  It is of minor importance to local commercial fisheries and can also be found in the aquarium trade.

References

External links
 Photograph

grammepomus
Fish of South Asia
Freshwater fish of Sri Lanka
Fish of New Guinea
Fish described in 1849